Teterev is a Russian masculine surname, its feminine counterpart is Tetereva. It may refer to
Boris Teterev (1953–2019), Latvian philanthropist
Ināra Tetereva (born 1953), Latvian patron of the arts and charity, wife of Boris
Vitaly Teterev (born 1983), Belarusian chess grandmaster

See also
Teteriv River

Russian-language surnames